Bashir Rage Shiiraar (born 1965) was a Somali secular rebel leader and businessman who hails from the Warsangali clan (an Abgaal subclan).

He became a member of the US-backed Alliance for the Restoration of Peace and Counter-Terrorism.

He was the head of the export department of the El-Ma An port which served as Mogadishu's port following the closure of the city's main harbour in 1995.

References

1965 births
Living people
Somalian businesspeople
Somalian faction leaders